Else Madelon Hooykaas (born 28 September 1942, in Maartensdijk) is a Dutch video artist, photographer and film maker. She makes films, sculptures, audio-video installations and has published several books.

Biography 
Madelon Hooykaas grew up in Rotterdam, the Netherlands. Before leaving for Paris in 1964, she studied under various Dutch photographers.

In 1966 she was awarded the Europhot Prize for young photographers, as the Netherlands representative, and she then left for England to work on the photo project Along the Pilgrim’s Way to Canterbury, inspired by Geoffrey Chaucer’s The Canterbury Tales. She remained in England as visiting student at the Ealing School of Art & Design in London.

Professionally what interested her was to make films and photography as vehicles for conceptual art and she made particular use of sequential photography. In Brussels she worked in a film laboratory and in Paris she was an assistant film production assistant before establishing herself as freelance photographer and film maker.

In 1968 she was awarded a travel scholarship by the Netherlands Ministry of the Arts to spend a year in the United States. In New York she worked as assistant to the photographers Philip Halsman and Bert Stern and had lessons from Garry Winogrand and Joel Meyerowitz. In California a meeting with Alan Watts formed the start of her lifelong interest in Zen Buddhism.

Back in the Netherlands, she moved to Amsterdam and started writing articles for the journal Foto, interviewing figures such as Robert Doisneau and Jacques Henri Lartigue. For a short while she worked as a portrait and fashion photographer, experimenting meanwhile with Polaroid photos in combination with texts; she also made silk screen prints in this period.

In 1970 she left for Japan to interview a number of photographers and with the aim of experiencing life in a Zen cloister. She was the first European woman to get permission to stay in a traditional monastery to take photographs. In 1971 her photo book Zazen, was published, for which she and the Dutch poet Bert Schierbeek compiled the texts. The publication of this book greatly enhanced her reputation and English and German editions followed. Five years later another book appeared, Death Shadow, for which Hooykaas made the photos and Schierbeek wrote the poem.

In 1972 Hooykaas held solo exhibitions of her Polaroid experiments in Il Diaframma in Milan, and The Photographer’s Gallery in London. Her work plays with space and time. Photo works by Hooykaas form part of the permanent collection of the Stedelijk Museum Amsterdam, the Museum of Modern Art (MoMA) in New York, the Centre Georges Pompidou/Musée National d’Art Moderne in Paris, the Bibliothèque Nationale de France (Paris) and the University of Leiden.

In 1972 Hooykaas started an intensive collaboration in the field of film with the British photographer and filmmaker Elsa Stansfield in London and Amsterdam. Their first movie, ‘Een van die dagen’ (One of Those Days) was broadcast by Dutch public TV in 1973. It was also shown at festivals in London, Toronto and New York. After that followed ‘Overbruggen’ (About Bridges) (1975), which was shown in several festivals including Cork, Rotterdam, and Grenoble.

Under the name Stansfield/Hooykaas they made their first video installations from 1975 onwards including ‘What’s It to You?’ (1975), Journeys (1976), Just Like That (1977) and ‘Split Seconds’ (1979).

Their work deals with the relation between nature and spirituality and explores scientific principles and natural forces such as radio waves and magnetic fields. Hooykaas and Stansfield make use of contemporary technology such as film, audio and video in combination with organic materials such as sand, glass and copper. In their work they show that everything that exists is animated by movement and change.

Work by Stansfield/Hooykaas is included in various international museum collections, and in the Netherlands it was awarded the Judith Leyster Prize in 1996.

The installations and films of Hooykaas/Stansfield have been exhibited in many venues, for instance in Montreal, Sydney (Biennale), Chicago, Madrid, Reykjavik, Kassel (Documenta), Museum of Modern Art in New York (MoMA), Stedelijk Museum Amsterdam, Bremen, Hanover, Berlin, Washington D.C., Lucerne, London (Whitechapel Gallery), Toronto, Hong Kong, Helsinki, Tokyo, Stockholm, Gemeentemuseum The Hague, Dundee and Hafnarfjordur. At the Film Festival in Split, Croatia in 1999 they were awarded the Grand Prix for New Media for Person to Person (CD-ROM).

The interactive website Wishing Tree was realized in 2002 for the Center for Art and Technology at Northwestern University in Evanston, Illinois, in collaboration with Rodrigo Cadiz and Brian Sarfatty.

In 2004 Elsa Stansfield died unexpectedly. In the years that followed Hooykaas produced various video installations and audio works, both under the name Stansfield/Hooykaas and her own name, including Daydreaming and Haiku, the Art of the Present Moment, inspired by the poetry of Matsuo Bashō.

In 2009 Hooykaas again travelled to Japan to stay in a Zen monastery. In 2010 she made two films about this second visit – Zazen nu/Zazen now and Het Pad/The Path – and she published the photo book Zazen nu [Zazen now] with an essay by Nico Tydeman.

In 2010 the book Revealing the Invisible – The Art of Stansfield/Hooykaas from Different Perspectives also appeared. This standard work about the oeuvre of Hooykaas and Stansfield contains international contributions by David F. Peat, Malcolm Dickson, Dorothea Franck, Nicole Gingras, Heiner Holtappels, Janneke Wesseling, Kitty Zijlmans and others.

For De Ketelfactory project space in Schiedam and for C.C.A. in Glasgow (Scotland) Madelon Hooykaas made the video installation and drawing Mount Analogue (2010), inspired by René Daumal's book Le Mont Analogue, on which Dorothea Franck wrote the essay Kunst en aandacht – Het beklimmen van Mount Analogue [Art and Mindfulness – Climbing Mount Analogue].

Recent exhibitions and screenings of works by Stansfield/Hooykaas and by Madelon Hooykaas were held in Museum Gouda, the Netherlands, and C.C.A. and Street Level Photoworks in Glasgow, Scotland (2010), Stedelijk Museum Amsterdam (2011) and  Biennale de Quebec, Canada, Museum of Religious Art in Uden and Japan Museum Siebold House, the Netherlands, and Tate Modern London (2012). In 2014 works of Elsa Stansfield/Madelon Hooykaas will be exhibited at 'The Invisible Force Behind' at Imai – inter media art institute within the Quadriennale Düsseldorf.

Broadcast by the Buddhist Broadcasting Foundation of Seeing in the Dark, in search of the last blind shamans in Japan on September 28, 2014 in the Netherlands.

Artist in Focus at the Buddhist Film Festival Europe on October 4, 5, 6, 2014 with the films: Haiku, the Art of the Present Moment, Mount Analogue and Seeing in the Dark and 20 photographs of her recent film at the Eye Film Museum in Amsterdam.

From 2015 onwards Hooykaas developed a new direction with a series of performances, in which video projection and drawing played an important role.
These were the works Grid, Mount Analogue and the series Virtual Walls/Real Walls.
These performances were shown in New York, Tokyo, Venice, Amsterdam, Berlin, Antwerp, Perth and Manchester.

Centraal Museum, Utrecht and Gaudeamus Music week commissioned Madelon Hooykaas and Louis Andriessen (in collaboration with Malu Peeters) the video installationEverything is Round shown from September 8, 2019 till January 19, 2020

References

 Else Madelon Hooykaas (photographs and diary) and Bert Schierbeek (essay) Zazen, 1971, N. Kluwer, Deventer; a German edition of Zazen was published in 1972 by Otto Wilhelm Barth Verlag, Weilheim Obb, BRD; and the English edition of Zazen in 1974 by Omen Press, Tucson, Arizona, USA.
 Else Madelon Hooykaas / Bert Schierbeek Death Shadow, 1976, Fiz-Subverspress, Alkmaar. The poem Death Shadow [for Else Madelon Hooykaas] also appeared in: Bert Schierbeek De gedichten [The Poems], de Bezige Bij, Amsterdam, 2004, pp. 522–528.
 Else Madelon Hooykaas 'Vita in Sequenza' in Il Diaframma no. 172, May 1972, p. 7.
 Else Madelon Hooykaas 'Time, an Abstract Symbol' in Creative Camera no 99, September 1972, London, pp. 318–319.
 De Boom in natuur, cultuur en religie, edited by Wouter Prins, Museum for Religieuze Kunst, Uden, p52-3, p57, p93.
 Madelon Hooykaas (photographs and diary) and Nico Tydeman (essay) Zazen nu - Het dagelijks leven in een Japans zenklooster, 2010, Ankh-Hermes, Deventer.
 Revealing the Invisible - The Art of Stansfield/Hooykaas from Different Perspectives, Edited by Madelon Hooykaas and Claire van Putten, 2010, de Buitenkant Publishers, Amsterdam. 
 Dorothea Franck 'Kunst en aandacht – Het beklimmen van Mount Analogue’ in: Stansfield/Hooykaas - Revealing the Invisible, De Ketelfactory, Schiedam, 2011, pp. 19–29. 
 Imai - distributor of Video art: https://web.archive.org/web/20140222171319/http://www.imaionline.de/content/view/228/lang,de/
 EWVA European Women's Video Art in the 70s and 80s Edit by: Laura Leuzzi, Elaine Shemilt, Stephen Partridge, Publisher: John Libbey Publishing Ltd UK, 2019 
 https://www.horsecross.co.uk/media/2044/read-more-laura-leuzzi-and-iliyana-nedkova-on-madelon-hooykaas-issue-14-low-res.pdf

External links 
 Website Madelon Hooykaas
 Website Stansfield/Hooykaas

1942 births
Living people
Photographers from Rotterdam
Dutch video artists
People from De Bilt
20th-century Dutch artists
21st-century Dutch artists
20th-century women photographers
21st-century women photographers
20th-century Dutch women artists
21st-century Dutch women artists